Jan Dominico Löhmannsröben (born 21 April 1991) is a German professional footballer who plays as a midfielder for FSV Zwickau.

Early life
Born in Kassel, he started playing football in Erlangen. His first club was Potsdamer Kickers 94, where he played for the F- to D-Youth teams. Subsequently, he went through the youth ranks of nearby SV Babelsberg and Hertha BSC.

Career
In the summer 2019, Löhmannsröben returned to former club FSV Wacker 90 Nordhausen. In October 2019, he was relegated to the club's reserve team alongside four other teammates. On 23 December 2019, SC Preußen Münster confirmed that Löhmannsröben would join the club on 1 January 2020 on a deal for the rest of the season.

In August 2020, Lohmannröben joined FC Hansa Rostock. After the season he left the club on mutual agreement.

In September 2021 he signed a contract with 3rd division club Hallescher FC.

References

External links
 
 

1991 births
Living people
Association football midfielders
German footballers
1. FC Magdeburg players
FC Carl Zeiss Jena players
1. FC Kaiserslautern players
VfB Oldenburg players
FSV Wacker 90 Nordhausen players
SC Preußen Münster players
FC Hansa Rostock players
Hallescher FC players
FSV Zwickau players
2. Bundesliga players
3. Liga players
Regionalliga players
Sportspeople from Kassel